A regional election took place in Alsace on 21 March and 28 March 2004, along with all other regions. Adrien Zeller (UMP) was re-elected President, defeating Jacques Bigot (PS).

Alsace regional election
2004